Daniel Chonghan Hong (March 3, 1956 – July 6, 2002) was a Korean-American theoretical physicist.

Hong was born in Seoul. He studied physics at the Seoul National University . In 1979 he received his bachelor's degree there, and in 1981 his master's degree. Afterwards, he started his doctorate studies at Boston University, which he finished in 1985 with a Ph.D. After that, he got a postdoc research position at the University of California in Santa Barbara, and later another position at the Emory University. In the year 1988 he became an assistant professor at the physics department of the Lehigh University. In 1994, he became an associate professor, and in 2000 a full professor.

He was interested in the dynamics of granular matter and researched on the granular flow, diffusion models, viscosity behavior and percolation, among other subjects.  The void diffusion model, developed by Dr. Hong and a Lehigh colleague, is widely recognized as an effective theoretical model for treating a broad range of dynamical phenomena in granular media.

His formal treatment of the physics of the popcorn-making process was extremely popular and enjoyed attention from both the physics community and the lay public. He actively engaged broader audiences by writing popular magazine articles on varied topics ranging from science to philosophy to religion.  He had collaborations going with numerous theorists all over the world.

From 1995 till 2000 he was editor of the AKPA Newsletter and belonged to the editors board of the KASTN, the Korean American Science and Technology News.

He died at the age of 46 on July 6, 2002. He was survived by his wife, Susy, and four children: Susan, Annie, Danny, and Juliana.

References

External links
Biography on the AKPA website

1956 births
2002 deaths
20th-century American physicists
Boston University alumni
South Korean physicists
Lehigh University faculty
People from Seoul
Seoul National University alumni